Scarpetta is an Italian word meaning "small shoe" and may refer to:

Art and literature
 Kay Scarpetta, a fictional character in a series of novels by Patricia Cornwell
 Scarpetta (novel), a 2008 novel in the series

People

Given name
Scarpetta Ordelaffi (died c. 1315) was an Italian condottiero and lord of Forlì

Surname
 Eduardo Scarpetta (1853–1925), an Italian actor and playwright 
 Cody Scarpetta (born 1988), a minor league baseball pitcher
Sergio Scarpetta (born 1975), an Italian grandmaster of English draughts

Other uses
Scarpetta, an American restaurant founded by Scott Conant (born 1971)